In physics, particularly in quantum perturbation theory, the matrix element refers to the linear operator of a modified Hamiltonian using Dirac notation.

The matrix element considers the effect of the newly modified Hamiltonian (i.e. the linear superposition of the unperturbed Hamiltonian plus interaction potential) on the quantum state.

Matrix elements are important in atomic, nuclear and particle physics.

See also
Fermi's golden rule

Perturbation theory 
Quantum mechanics